The Killik Cup is a rugby union trophy awarded to the winners of matches between the Barbarians and national teams. Killik & Co have sponsored an annual match involving the Barbarians in the UK since 2011. The cup was first contested in 2011 when the Barbarians played Australia, with the Barbarians losing 60–11. Most recently the Barbarians won back the cup, after defeating England  52–21 in June 2022.

Results

References

Rugby union competitions in England
Sports competitions in London
Barbarian F.C.